This is a list of listed buildings in the Highland council area of Scotland. For Category A listed buildings, see List of Category A listed buildings in Highland.

The list is split out by civil parish.

 List of listed buildings in Abernethy And Kincardine, Highland
 List of listed buildings in Alness, Highland
 List of listed buildings in Alvie, Highland
 List of listed buildings in Applecross, Highland
 List of listed buildings in Ardclach, Highland
 List of listed buildings in Ardersier, Highland
 List of listed buildings in Ardgour, Highland
 List of listed buildings in Ardnamurchan
 List of listed buildings in Arisaig And Moidart, Highland
 List of listed buildings in Assynt, Highland
 List of listed buildings in Auldearn, Highland
 List of listed buildings in Avoch, Highland
 List of listed buildings in Boleskine And Abertarff, Highland
 List of listed buildings in Bower, Highland
 List of listed buildings in Bracadale, Highland
 List of listed buildings in Canisbay, Highland
 List of listed buildings in Cawdor, Highland
 List of listed buildings in Clyne, Highland
 List of listed buildings in Contin, Highland
 List of listed buildings in Creich, Highland
 List of listed buildings in Cromarty, Highland
 List of listed buildings in Cromdale, Inverallan And Advie, Highland
 List of listed buildings in Croy And Dalcross, Highland
 List of listed buildings in Daviot And Dunlichity, Highland
 List of listed buildings in Dingwall, Highland
 List of listed buildings in Dores, Highland
 List of listed buildings in Dornoch, Highland
 List of listed buildings in Duirinish, Highland
 List of listed buildings in Dunnet, Highland
 List of listed buildings in Durness, Highland
 List of listed buildings in Duthil And Rothiemurchus, Highland
 List of listed buildings in Edderton, Highland
 List of listed buildings in Eddrachillis, Highland
 List of listed buildings in Farr, Highland
 List of listed buildings in Fearn, Highland
 List of listed buildings in Fodderty, Highland
 List of listed buildings in Fort William, Highland
 List of listed buildings in Fortrose, Highland
 List of listed buildings in Gairloch, Highland
 List of listed buildings in Glenelg, Highland
 List of listed buildings in Glenorchy And Inishail, Highland
 List of listed buildings in Glenshiel, Highland
 List of listed buildings in Golspie, Highland
 List of listed buildings in Grantown On Spey, Highland
 List of listed buildings in Halkirk, Highland
 List of listed buildings in Invergordon, Highland
 List of listed buildings in Inverness And Bona, Highland
 List of listed buildings in Inverness, Highland
 List of listed buildings in Kildonan, Highland
 List of listed buildings in Killearnan, Highland
 List of listed buildings in Kilmallie, Highland
 List of listed buildings in Kilmonivaig, Highland
 List of listed buildings in Kilmorack, Highland
 List of listed buildings in Kilmuir Easter, Highland
 List of listed buildings in Kilmuir, Highland
 List of listed buildings in Kiltarlity And Convinth, Highland
 List of listed buildings in Kiltearn, Highland
 List of listed buildings in Kincardine, Highland
 List of listed buildings in Kingussie And Insh, Highland
 List of listed buildings in Kingussie, Highland
 List of listed buildings in Kintail, Highland
 List of listed buildings in Kirkhill, Highland
 List of listed buildings in Knockbain, Highland
 List of listed buildings in Laggan, Highland
 List of listed buildings in Lairg, Highland
 List of listed buildings in Latheron, Highland
 List of listed buildings in Lismore And Appin, Highland
 List of listed buildings in Lochalsh, Highland
 List of listed buildings in Lochbroom, Highland
 List of listed buildings in Lochcarron, Highland
 List of listed buildings in Logie Easter, Highland
 List of listed buildings in Loth, Highland
 List of listed buildings in Morvern, Highland
 List of listed buildings in Moy And Dalarossie, Highland
 List of listed buildings in Nairn, Highland
 List of listed buildings in Nigg, Highland
 List of listed buildings in Olrig, Highland
 List of listed buildings in Petty, Highland
 List of listed buildings in Portree, Highland
 List of listed buildings in Reay, Highland
 List of listed buildings in Resolis, Highland
 List of listed buildings in Rogart, Highland
 List of listed buildings in Rosemarkie, Highland
 List of listed buildings in Rosskeen, Highland
 List of listed buildings in Sleat, Highland
 List of listed buildings in Small Isles, Highland
 List of listed buildings in Snizort, Highland
 List of listed buildings in Strath, Highland
 List of listed buildings in Tain, Highland
 List of listed buildings in Tarbat, Highland
 List of listed buildings in Thurso, Highland
 List of listed buildings in Tongue, Highland
 List of listed buildings in Urquhart And Glenmoriston, Highland
 List of listed buildings in Urquhart And Logie Wester, Highland
 List of listed buildings in Urray, Highland
 List of listed buildings in Watten, Highland
 List of listed buildings in Wick, Highland

Highland (council area)